is a Japanese footballer who plays for ReinMeer Aomori.

Career
Kinoshita moved to Japan Football League club ReinMeer Aomori on 26 December 2019.

Club statistics
Updated to 23 February 2018.

References

External links

Profile at Mito HollyHock
Profile at Fukushima United FC

1993 births
Living people
Association football people from Shizuoka Prefecture
Japanese footballers
J1 League players
J2 League players
J3 League players
Júbilo Iwata players
Mito HollyHock players
Fukushima United FC players
J.League U-22 Selection players
Fujieda MYFC players
Iwate Grulla Morioka players
ReinMeer Aomori players
Association football defenders